Denmark–Italy relations refers to the current and historical relations between Denmark and Italy. Both countries have embassies in their respective capitals and both countries are members of the European Union and NATO. 

Diplomatic relations were established on 2 September 1861 and relations are described as a "solid bond of friendship and cooperation". Ties between the two countries are based on the common European vocation.

The two countries have moreover developed close cultural exchanges since the 1960s.

History 
After the Unification of Italy in 17 March 1861, Italy was represented in Denmark through its diplomatic office in Stockholm, Sweden. Italian Prime Minister Cavour ordered the Italian diplomat in Sweden Marquis Migliorati to communicate to Danish king Frederick VII the assumption of Victor Emmanuel II as King of Italy. The Italian side expressed doubt on a Danish recognition of the newly established Italian state as Denmark was engaged in a dispute with Prussia pertaining to the rights over German–speaking Schleswig-Holstein. The Italian belief was therefore that Denmark could not endorse the new Italian state as it was inspired by Italian nationalism which would corroborate German claims over Schleswig-Holstein. Nonetheless, the Danish people had strong sympathy for Italy inducing the king to grant recognition.

King Frederick VII wrote a letter to king Victor Emmanuel II on 2 September 1861 in which it was stated that Denmark recognized the Kingdom of Italy and an Italian legation was established in Copenhagen. In May 1864, the two countries signed a commercial treaty to strengthen trade. The relations between the two countries was described as "good" in the treaty. An extradition agreement was signed in July 1873, while an agreement on "reciprocal relief to distrissed seamen" was signed in May 1885.

See also

 Foreign relations of Denmark 
 Foreign relations of Italy

References

Further reading 

 
 
 

 
Italy
Bilateral relations of Italy